King’s College Budo is a mixed, residential,
secondary school in Central Uganda (Buganda).

Location
The school is located on Naggalabi Hill, in southern Wakiso District, off the Kampala-Masaka Road.

History
The school was officially opened on 29 March 1906 with 21 boys. It was founded by His Majesty's Acting Commissioner of the Uganda Protectorate, George Wilson and the Church Missionary Society. It is one of the oldest schools in Uganda. The land on which it was built on was donated by the Kabaka of Buganda. The school was originally started a boys only school for the sons of chiefs and kings. In 1934 girls were also admitted making it a mixed-sex education school.

The school has benefited from the support of Monkton Combe School in England.  During the service of thanksgiving for Monkton Combe School's centenary held at St Paul's Cathedral in London in May 1968, the money donated during the collection was used to found several Monkton Combe scholarships at King's College.

In late March 1979, the college staff evacuated the students and the remaining civilian population of Budo hill due to the Uganda–Tanzania War. The Libyan Armed Forces, allied with the Uganda Army at the time, subsequently set up camp at the facility. Soon after, the Tanzania People's Defence Force (TPDF) and Ugandan rebels attacked and overran the camp as part of Operation Dada Idi. About two dozen Libyans were killed and buried at a nearby mass grave.

The TPDF consequently used the King's College Budo as base, and when it was reopened in June 1979, the students coexisted with the Tanzanian soldiers until the latter withdrew from Uganda.

Notable alumni
Alumni of Budo are known as Old Budonians. Old Budonians have distinguished themselves in service to Uganda and Buganda Kingdom.

Royals
Edward Mutesa II - 35th Kabaka of Buganda and first President of Uganda
Ezekiel Tenywa Wako - Zibondo of Bulamogi
George David Matthew Kamurasi Rukidi III of Toro - Omukama of Toro
Henry Wako Muloki - Kyabazinga of Busoga
Muwenda Mutebi II - 36th Kabaka of Buganda
Yosia Nadiope - Gabula of Bugabula, Busoga

Politics
Abu Mayanja - Attorney general and third deputy prime minister 1986-1994 
Aggrey Awori - Minister for ICT 2009-2011
Apolo Nsibambi - Prime minister of Uganda 1999-2011
Beti Kamya-Turwomwe - Founding president of the Uganda Federal Alliance, presidential candidate in 2011
Charles Njonjo - Attorney general of Kenya 1963-1979
Bertha Kingori - member of the Legislative Council of Tanganyika
Crispus Kiyonga - Minister of Defence since 2006, member of the Ugandan parliament representing Bukonjo West
Godfrey Binaisa - Fifth president of Uganda
Jehoash Mayanja Nkangi - Justice minister (1998–2008), finance minister (1989–1998), and Katikkiro of Buganda (1964–1966, 1993–1994)
Ignatius K. Musaazi - Founder of the first political party in Uganda, the Uganda National Congress
James Wapakhabulo - Speaker of the Ugandan parliament 1993-1996
John Ssebaana Kizito - Mayor of Kampala 1996-2006
Olara Otunnu - UPC president, under secretary of the United Nations
Sam Kutesa - Former Member of the Ugandan parliament and Former Minister for Foreign Affairs
Samson Kisekka - Vice president of Uganda 1991-1994, prime minister of Uganda 1986-1991
Yusuf Lule - Fourth president of Uganda
Apollo Kironde - Uganda's first representative to the U.N

Law
 Benjamin Joseph Odoki - Chief Justice of the Republic of Uganda (2001-2013)
 Alfonse Owiny-Dollo - Chief Justice of the Republic of Uganda since September 2020 and Deputy Chief Justice of the Republic of Uganda, 2017-2020
 James Munange Ogoola - former Principal Judge and former Head of the Commercial Court of Uganda
 Julia Sebutinde -  Judge at the International Court of Justice, The Hague, Netherlands
 Michael Chibita- Justice of the Supreme Court of Uganda
 Peter Nyombi- former Attorney General of the Republic of Uganda
 Kiryowa Kiwanuka-Attorney General of the Republic of Uganda since May 2021
 Katende Jimmy Rodgers Serunjogi- Senior Partner at Katende Serunjogi & Co. Advocates

Diplomats and civil service
 Amanya Mushega - former secretary general of the East African Community (2001-2006)
 Jennifer Musisi - lawyer and administrator, former executive director of the Kampala Capital City Authority (2011-2018)

Academia
 Frederick Kayanja - vice chancellor Mbarara University of Science & Technology, 1989-2014
 Peter Mugyenyi - HIV/AIDS researcher, co-founder and director of the Joint Clinical Research Centre, chancellor of the Mbarara University of Science and Technology, since 2009
 Senteza Kajubi - vice chancellor Makerere University 1977-1979, 1990-1993
 David Justin Bakibinga – professor of commercial law since 1998 and deputy vice chancellor (finance and administration), 2004-2009, Makerere University

Writers
 Christopher Henry Muwanga Barlow - poet
 David Rubadiri - poet and first Malawian ambassador to the United Nations
 Elvania Namukwaya Zirimu - poet, dramatist
 Okot p'Bitek - poet
 Timothy Wangusa - author, poet, and literature scholar
 Phillip Matogo

See also
 Education in Uganda
 Groupe Scolaire Officiel de Butare, a comparable institution in Rwanda

References

Further reading
 McGregor, G. P. "King's College Budo: the First Sixty Years." Nairobi: Oxford University Press, 1967
 Summers, Carol: "Subterranean Evil" and "Tumultuous Riot" in Buganda: Authority and Alienation at King's College, Budo 1942."  Journal of African History vol 47 number 1 2006 pages 93-113. Also reproduced at: http://scholarship.richmond.edu/history-faculty-publications/21/
 Kipkorir, B.E. "Replica of an English School: Kings College, Budo," East Africa Journal, Nairobi, November 1967 pages 34–35
 Kayondo, Edward, Who Is Who From Budo, 1906-2006 (Kampala, 2006) OL16281638M
 McGregor, Gordon P., The History Of King's College Budo, Uganda; In Relation To The Development Of Education In Uganda (Kampala, University Of East Africa Press, 1965)
 McGregor, Gordon P., King's College Budo: The First Sixty Years (Nairobi, Oxford University Press, 1967) OL20750999M 
 McGregor, Gordon P., King's College Budo 1906-2006: A Centenary History (Kampala, Fountain Publishers, 2006) 
 Shin, Andrew: "Locating King’s College Budo: A study of Politics and Relationships in Colonial Buganda". A thesis submitted in partial fulfillment of the requirements for the degree of Bachelor of Arts in the Department of History, University of Michigan, USA, 1 April 2015.
 About King's College, Budo.

External links
 Website of King's College Budo
 Location of King's College Budo At Google Maps
 Kings College Budo Reviews

Educational institutions established in 1906
Boarding schools in Uganda
Mixed schools in Uganda
Wakiso District
1906 establishments in Uganda
Schools in Uganda
People educated at King's College Budo